The year 1967 in television involved some significant events. Below is a list of television-related events in 1967.

Events
January 15 
The inaugural Super Bowl is simulcast on CBS and NBC
The Rolling Stones appear on CBS's The Ed Sullivan Show, where, at Sullivan's insistence, they perform "Let's Spend the Night Together" as "Let's Spend Some Time Together."
January 29 – The first CBS Playhouse presentation, The Final War of Olly Winter, is televised.
 February 16 – The first airing of "Space Seed", the Star Trek television episode that introduces popular villain Khan Noonien Singh, as played by Ricardo Montalbán, is aired on NBC.
February 23 – The Beatles make a taped appearance on ABC's American Bandstand, where they premiere their new music videos for the songs "Penny Lane" and "Strawberry Fields Forever".
February 25 – Gene Kelly stars in Jack and the Beanstalk; airing on NBC and produced by Hanna-Barbera, it is the first TV special to combine live action and animation.
March – Gunsmoke is renewed by CBS for the fall 1967 season.  Aging (it was completing its 12th season) and declining in the ratings, CBS planned to cancel the western, but protests from viewers, network affiliates and even members of Congress and especially William S. Paley (Gunsmoke was Paley's wife's favorite show), the head of the network, lead the network to move the series from its longtime late Saturday time slot to early Mondays for the fall—displacing Gilligan's Island, which initially had been renewed for the fall but is cancelled instead.  Gunsmoke would remain on CBS until 1975.
March 6 – Mark Twain Tonight! starring Hal Holbrook as Mark Twain, premieres on CBS.
March 11 – This was the last day that French-language TV stations in Canada were required to run "personals" (classified advertising) between 6–7 p.m. Monday through Saturday.
May 1 – The United Network (initially known as the Overmyer Network) launches broadcasting with the talk/variety show The Las Vegas Show—which would be the only show it airs, as both network and show disappear in June due in part to transmission expenses.
May 13 – TV Bandeirantes São Paulo, a first network television station of Rede Bandeirantes, an officially regular broadcasting service to start in Brazil.
May – David Dortort appoints himself executive producer of Bonanza, a move which takes him out of the day-to-day running of the show but allows him to spend his efforts on another NBC western, The High Chaparral.
July 10 – The fourth Peanuts special, You're in Love, Charlie Brown, with a springtime theme, has its premiere on CBS.
June 15 – ATV0, Melbourne, launches color television in Australia with live coverage of the Pakenham races.
June 25 – The special Our World becomes the first live worldwide "via satellite" TV broadcast, transmitting to 30 countries.  Performers include Mick Jagger, Marianne Faithfull, Keith Richards, Keith Moon, Eric Clapton, Pattie Harrison, Jane Asher, Graham Nash, Hunter Davies, and The Beatles (who perform "All You Need Is Love," a song composed especially for the occasion).
July 1 – With live coverage from the Wimbledon Championships of tennis, BBC2 becomes Europe's first color TV broadcaster, although still in the experimental stage.
July 28 – In the VPRO television show Hoepla, model Phil Bloom flashes nude in front of the cameras. Several angry viewers complain by sending letters of protests.
August 6 – Formula One auto racing has its first colour TV broadcast, as the 1967 German Grand Prix raced at Nürburgring is colorcast to a West German audience on an experimental basis.
August 21 – ABC's Dark Shadows and CBS's As the World Turns are the first daytime soaps on their respective networks to go color.
August 25 – Color television is officially launched in West Germany (simultaneously by ARD and ZDF) at precisely 9:30 am, with a symbolic launch button pressed by Willy Brandt at the Internationale Funkausstellung Berlin.
August 29 – The Fugitive finale proves to be one of the most-watched episodes of the decade.
September 2 – At 12:30 pm, Channel 9 in Sioux City, Iowa switches from being KVTV (CBS basic) to KCAU-TV (ABC full-time). Three days later, CBS returns to the area when KMEG-TV signs-on.
September 9 – NBC airs what will prove to be the pilot of Rowan and Martin's Laugh-In; which would have its actual series premiere on January 22, 1968.
September 10 – The Who destroy their instruments during a performance on CBS's The Smothers Brothers Comedy Hour
September 17 – The Doors appear on The Ed Sullivan Show and perform "Light My Fire". Sullivan had requested that the line "Girl we couldn't get much higher" be changed for the show, but Jim Morrison performs it the way it was written and the band is banned from the show as a result.
October 1 
First colour television broadcasts introduced in France, RSFSR and BSSR using SECAM system.
In the VPRO TV show Hoepla, model Phil Bloom is seen reading a newspaper; when she folds the newspaper, she is completely nude (the first time someone appears nude in a television program).
November 7 - The Golden Jubilee October Revolution Day Parades in Moscow, Leningrad and Minsk are first major events to be broadcast in color in the Soviet Union using SECAM system.
November 19 – TVB launches free-to-air television in Hong Kong.
November 27 – Thai Army Television converts from System M (a 525-line screen) to System B (625 lines) in preparation for PAL color (to be launched in 1969).
December 2 – Color television is officially launched on BBC2.
December 11 – NBC airs the all-star special Movin' With Nancy, featuring Nancy Sinatra and guests.
December 21 – The only guests for a highly rated holiday episode of The Dean Martin Show are the family members of Martin and Frank Sinatra.
December 26 – The Beatles' Magical Mystery Tour airs on BBC1 in the UK.
Also in 1967
All CBS soap operas transition from live to tape broadcasts
PAL and SECAM video standards introduced
 A taped appearance by The Beatles on the Ed Sullivan Show, premiering their new music video for the song "Hello Goodbye"
The FCC orders that cigarette ads on television, radio and in print must include a warning about the health risks of smoking
The Corporation for Public Broadcasting is established
Cissy King replaces Barbara Boylan as Bobby Burgess's dance partner on The Lawrence Welk Show.

Programs/Programmes
American Bandstand (1952–89)
Another World (1964–99)
Armchair Theatre (1956–68)
As the World Turns (1956–2010)
Batman (1966–68)
Bewitched (1964–72)
Blue Peter (UK) (1958–present)
Bonanza (1959–73)
Bozo the Clown (1949–present)
Candid Camera (1948–present)
Captain Kangaroo (1955–84)
Come Dancing (UK) (1949–95)
Coronation Street (UK) (1960–present)
Crossroads (UK) (1964–88, 2001–03)
Daniel Boone (1964–70)
Dark Shadows (1966–71)
Days of Our Lives (1965–present)
Dixon of Dock Green (UK) (1955–76)
Doctor Who (UK) (1963–89, 1996, 2005–present)
Face the Nation (1954–present)
Family Affair (1966–71)
Four Corners (Australia) (1961–present)
General Hospital (1963–present)
Get Smart (1965–70)
Gomer Pyle, U.S.M.C. (1964–70)
Grandstand (UK) (1958–2007)
Green Acres (1965–71)
Gunsmoke (1955–75)
Hallmark Hall of Fame (1951–present)
Hockey Night in Canada (1952–present)
Hogan's Heroes (1965–71)
I Dream of Jeannie (1965–70)
I Spy (1965–1968)
It's Academic (1961–present)
Jeopardy! (1964–75, 1984–present)
Lost in Space (1965–68)
Love of Life (1951–80)
Match Game (1962–69, 1973–84, 1990–91, 1998–99)
Meet the Press (1947–present)
Mission: Impossible (1966–73)
Mutual of Omaha's Wild Kingdom (1963–88, 2002–present)
My Three Sons (1960–72)
Opportunity Knocks (UK) (1956–78)
Panorama (UK) (1953–present)
Petticoat Junction (1963–70)
Peyton Place (1964–69)
Play School (1966–present)
Run for Your Life (1965–1968)
Search for Tomorrow (1951–86)
Star Trek (1966–69)
That Girl (1966–71)
The Andy Griffith Show (1960–68)
The Avengers (UK) (1961–69)
The Bell Telephone Hour (1959–68)
The Beverly Hillbillies (1962–71)
The Dean Martin Show (1965–74)
The Doctors (1963–82)
The Ed Sullivan Show (1948–71)
The Edge of Night (1956–84)
The Fulton Sheen Program (1961–68)
The Good Old Days (UK) (1953–83)
The Guiding Light (1952–2009)
The Hollywood Palace (1964–1970)
The Late Late Show (Ireland) (1962–present)
The Lawrence Welk Show (1955–82)
The Lucy Show (1962–68)
The Mavis Bramston Show (Australia) (1964–68)
The Mike Douglas Show (1961–82)
The Money Programme (UK) (1966–present)
The Monkees (1966–68)
The Mothers-in-Law (1967–69)
The Newlywed Game (1966–74)
The Saint (UK) (1962–69)
The Secret Storm (1954–74)
The Sky at Night (UK) (1957–present)
The Today Show (1952–present)
The Tonight Show Starring Johnny Carson (1962–92)
The Wednesday Play (UK) (1964–70)
This Is Your Life (UK) (1955–2003)
Tom and Jerry (1965–72, 1975–77, 1980–82)
Top of the Pops (UK) (1964–2006)
Truth or Consequences (1950–88)
Walt Disney's Wonderful World of Color (1961–69)
What the Papers Say (UK) (1956–2008)
World of Sport (1965–85)
Z-Cars (UK) (1962–78)

Debuts 
 January 7 
The Forsyte Saga, BBC drama in 26 50-minute episodes
A prime-time edition of The Newlywed Game (1967–71) on ABC
 January 9 – Mr. Terrific on CBS (Last aired on August 27, 1967)
 January 13 – Rango on ABC (Last aired on September 1, 1967)
 February 5 – The Smothers Brothers Comedy Hour (1967–69) on CBS
 February 13 – Mr. Dressup (1967–96) on CBC
 July 3 – News at Ten (1967–99, 2001–04, 2008–present) on ITV in the UK
 September 5 
The Prisoner on Canada's CTV Television Network
Good Morning World on CBS (1967–1968)
 September 6 – He & She (1967–68) and Dundee and the Culhane (Fall 1967 only) both on CBS
 September 7 
The Flying Nun (1967–70) on ABC
Cimarron Strip (1967–68) on CBS
 September 8 – Hondo (ended December 29, 1967) on ABC
 September 9 – Spider-Man (1967–70) and George of the Jungle (1967) on ABC
 September 10 – The Mothers-in-Law (1967–69) and The High Chaparral (1967–71) both on NBC
 September 11 – The Carol Burnett Show (1967–78) on CBS
 September 14 – Ironside (1967–75) on NBC
 September 16 – Mannix (1967–75) on CBS
 September 18 – Love is a Many Splendored Thing (1967–73) on CBS daytime
 September 29 – The Prisoner is broadcast in the UK on ATV and Grampian Television
 October 1 – Ultra Seven (1967–68) on TBS in Japan 
 December 26 – Do Not Adjust Your Set on ITV (1967–69)

Ending this year

Births

Deaths

Television Debuts
Rutanya Alda – The Borgia Stick
Ed Begley Jr. – My Three Sons
Candice Bergen – Coronet Blue
Cher – The Man from U.N.C.L.E.
Dennis Christopher – The Time Tunnel
Timothy Dalton – Sat'day While Sunday
Frederic Forrest – Dark Shadows
Michael Gambon – Softly, Softly
Goldie Hawn – Good Morning World
Eric Idle – No – That's Me Over Here!	
Diane Keen – Love Story
Ed Lauter – Dark Shadows
Kay Lenz – The Monroes
Steve Martin – Off to See the Wizard
Annette O'Toole – My Three Sons
Stephen Rea – Angel Pavement
John Ritter – The Dating Game
Alex Rocco – Batman
Jan-Michael Vincent – Dragnet

References